Ronald William Marshall (26 November 1915 – 2 November 2001) was an Australian rules footballer who played with Melbourne in the Victorian Football League (VFL) and Port Melbourne in the Victorian Football Association (VFA).

Marshall also served in the Australian Army for 11 months during World War II.

Notes

External links 
 
 Ron Marshall's playing statistics from The VFA Project
 Ron Marshall's profile at Demonwiki

1915 births
2001 deaths
Australian rules footballers from Melbourne
Melbourne Football Club players
Port Melbourne Football Club players
People from South Yarra, Victoria